Shri Ram Murti Smarak Institute of Medical Sciences is a private medical college located near Bareilly in Bareilly district, Uttar Pradesh, India. The college affiliated to M. J. P. Rohilkhand University, Bareilly was established in 2002.

Courses

Undergraduate Courses 
 MBBS (Bachelor of Medicine and Bachelor of Surgery)

Postgraduate Courses

Pre-Clinical 
 MD - Anatomy, Physiology, Biochemistry

Para-Clinical 
 MD - Pathology, Microbiology, Pharmacology, Forensic Medicine, Community Medicine

Clinical 
 MD - General Medicine, Dermatology, Anaesthesia, Paediatrics, Radiodiagnosis, General Surgery, Radiotherapy, Psychiatry, Respiratory
 MS - Orthopaedics, Oto Rhino Laryngology (ENT), Ophthalmology, Obstetrics & Gynaecology

Diploma Courses 
 Indian Diploma in Critical Care Medicine(IDCCM)

Certificate Courses 
 Post M.B.B.S Certificate Course In Critical Care

Ranking 
Indian national media survey agencies evaluate Medical Colleges every year on various attributes and release ranks based on cumulative scores of attributes. SRMS IMS has been ranked on grounds of its Academics, Scholars, Research and Infrastructure among top Medical Colleges in India successively.

References

Private medical colleges in India
Medical colleges in Uttar Pradesh
Bareilly district
Educational institutions established in 2005
2005 establishments in Uttar Pradesh